Longeville-lès-Metz (literally Longeville near Metz) is a commune in the Moselle department in Grand Est in north-eastern France.

Notable people
 Jeff Roland, artist

See also
 Communes of the Moselle department

References

External links
 

Longevillelesmetz